The Nebraska Danger was a professional indoor football team based in Grand Island, Nebraska, and a member of the Indoor Football League (IFL). The team was founded in 2011 by Charlie Bosselman as an expansion member of the IFL. The Danger played their home games at Eihusen Arena.

In 2011 and 2012, the Nebraska Danger was selected as having the IFL's Best Fans. In 2013, the Danger were named IFL Franchise of the Year. Former general manager Mike McCoy was named 2013 IFL Executive of the Year and quarterback Jameel Sewell was named the 2013 IFL Most Valuable Player and Offensive Player of the Year.

History
On October 4, 2010, Bosselman Entertainment LLC announced the formation of Nebraska Danger as an expansion member of the Indoor Football League (IFL) for the  season. At the press conference, team owner Charlie Bosselman announced that Sean Ponder would be the team's inaugural head coach, however after just two months on the job, Ponder left the Danger for personal reasons, and Mike Davis was named head coach. On March 7, 2011, the Danger defeated the Wichita Wild 70–59, in the team's first game.

On June 28, 2014, the Danger traveled to Sioux Falls, South Dakota, for a second-straight year looking to defeat the Storm for the United Bowl. The Danger came up short again, falling 46–63.

On September 7, 2016, Hurtis Chinn was promoted to head coach after Mike Davis announced he was taking a role with the Saskatchewan Roughriders.

After the 2019 season, the Bosselman family announced they were looking to sell the team. No owner was found before the deadline for participating in the 2020 season.

Statistics and records

Season-by-season results

Head coach records

Players

Final roster

All-League selections
 QB Jameel Sewell (2)
 RB Waymon James (1)
 WR Kayne Farquharson (3), O. J. Simpson (1)
 OL Darius Savage (4), Trevis Turner (1)
 DL Claude Wroten (1), Justin Edison (1), Eze Obiora, (1)
 LB Maurice Simpkins (1), Cornelius Brown (1)
 DB Jamar Love (1), Jabari Gorman (1), Trey Wafford (1)
 K Joe Houston (1)

Individual awards
The following is a list of all Danger players who have won league awards:

Staff

References

External links 
Nebraska Danger official website
Nebraska Danger at The Grand Island Independent

 
Indoor Football League teams
American football teams in Nebraska
Sports in the Tri-Cities, Nebraska
Grand Island, Nebraska
American football teams established in 2010
2010 establishments in Nebraska
2019 disestablishments in Nebraska
American football teams disestablished in 2019